Kharkuiyeh (also Romanized as Khārkū’īyeh; also known as Khārkū and Khārkūn) is a village in Horjand Rural District, Kuhsaran District, Ravar County, Kerman Province, Iran. At the 2006 census, its population was 138, in 39 families.

References 

Populated places in Ravar County